The 1993 Tour of Britain was the seventh edition of the Kellogg's Tour of Britain cycle race and was held from 9 August to 13 August 1993. The race started in Portsmouth and finished in Liverpool. The race was won by Phil Anderson of the Motorola team.

Route

General classification

References

1993
Tour of Britain
Tour of Britain
August 1993 sports events in the United Kingdom